The architectural firm now known as Holabird & Root was founded in Chicago in 1880. Over the years, the firm has changed its name several times and adapted to the architectural style then current — from Chicago School to Art Deco to Modern Architecture to Sustainable Architecture.

Holabird & Root provides architectural, engineering, interior design, and planning services.  It is Chicago's oldest architecture firm. The firm remains a privately held partnership currently operating with five principals and four associate principals.

History
The founders, William Holabird and Ossian Cole Simonds, worked in the office of William LeBaron Jenney. They set up their own independent practice, Holabird & Simonds, in 1880 when they took on the project for an extension to Graceland Cemetery, passed on to them by Jenney. In 1881, Martin Roche, who had also worked for Jenney, joined them as a third partner. After only working together on five projects, Simonds left the firm in 1883 to pursue a career as a landscape architect.  Holabird, Simonds & Roche became Holabird & Roche. A few years later however, the firm once again collaborated with the ex-partner when, from 1889 to 1895, they designed and built Fort Sheridan, for which Simonds provided the landscaping.

Beginning with the Tacoma Building (completed 1889; demolished 1929), their first major commission, and the Marquette Building (1895), the firm became well known for its groundbreaking Chicago School skyscrapers. An enormously successful practice, they also designed large, ornate hotels across the country, including Chicago's Palmer House, with Richard Neutra in a junior role on the team. Their work was part of the architecture event in the art competition at the 1928 Summer Olympics and the 1932 Summer Olympics.

In 1928, after the deaths of William Holabird (1923) and Martin Roche (1927), the firm was renamed Holabird & Root. The new firm was run by Holabird's son John Augur Holabird and John Wellborn Root Jr., who had both joined back in 1914. Under their leadership, the firm adopted an Art Deco style. The company name changed to Holabird, Root & Burgee for a while, and two further generations of Holabirds served as partners (up to 1987). Currently located in the Marquette Building, the firm is once again called Holabird & Root, though no one of either name is currently affiliated.

Buildings

 

Graceland Cemetery Chapel, 1888
Pontiac Building, 1891
Monadnock Building (southern half), 1893
McConnell Apartments, 1210 North Astor (Chicago), 1897
Gage Group Buildings, 1899
57 East Jackson Boulevard (Chicago), 1899
Chicago Building, 1904
Oliver Building, 1907 & 1920
University Club of Chicago, 1908
Cook County Courthouse/Chicago City Hall, 1910
North American Building, 36 South State Street (Chicago), 1911
Sherman House Hotel, 1911
Century Building, 1915
Muehlebach Hotel, 1915
University Laboratory High School (Urbana, Illinois), 1917
Waterman Building (Chicago), 1920
Memorial Stadium (Champaign), 1923
Chicago Temple Building, 1923
Nicollet Hotel, Minneapolis, Minnesota, 1924
Soldier Field, 1924
Palmer House Hotel, 1925
Hotel Wausau, Wausau, Wisconsin, 1925
Pedestals for Ivan Meštrović's The Bowman and The Spearman statues, 1926
Stevens Hotel, 1927
Schroeder Hotel. Milwaukee, 1928
333 North Michigan Building, Chicago, Illinois, 1928
Palmolive Building, Chicago, 1929
Chicago Daily News Building, Chicago, 1929
Rand Tower, Minneapolis, Minnesota, 1929
Chicago Board of Trade Building, Chicago, 1930
Henry Crown Field House, Chicago, 1931
University of Illinois Ice Arena, 1931
Battle Creek Tower, Battle Creek, Michigan, 1931
Jefferson County Courthouse (Birmingham, Alabama), 1929-1932
Wrigley Field Hand-turned Scoreboard and Center Field Bleachers, 1937
Mason City Public Library, Mason City, Iowa, 1939
North Dakota State Capitol Building, Bismarck, North Dakota, 1934
Statler Hotel Washington, 1943
Adams County Courthouse, Quincy, 1950
Morris InnUniversity of Notre Dame, 1951
Hotel Tequendama, Bogotá, Colombia, 1952.
Fisher Hall (University of Notre Dame), 1953
Pangborn Hall (University of Notre Dame), 1955
One Financial Plaza, Minneapolis, 1960
Skybridge, City of Davenport, Iowa, 2005
Ogle County Courthouse Renovation, Oregon, Illinois, 2010
School of the Art Institute of Chicago Champlain Building Roof and Facade Renovation, Chicago, Illinois, 2012

Sources
Blaser, Werner.  Chicago Architecture: Holabird & Root, 1880–1992.  Basel; Boston: Birkhauser Verlag, 1992.
Bruegmann, Robert.  Holabird & Roche/Holabird & Root: An Illustrated Catalog of Works, 1880–1940.  New York: Garland Publishing, 1991.
Bruegmann, Robert.  The Architects and the City: Holabird & Roche of Chicago, 1880–1918.  Chicago: University of Chicago Press, 1997.

References

External links

Holabird & Root's current website
Holabird & Roche/Root Chicago Encyclopedia entry
Holabird & Roche Archive at the Chicago Historical Society
 Holabird & Root on Google Maps

Category:Master Planning
Category: Interior Design
Category: Structural Engineering Chicago
Category: Sustainable Architecture

 
Chicago school architects
Architecture firms based in Chicago
Companies based in Chicago
Companies established in 1880
Chicago school architecture in Illinois
Olympic competitors in art competitions